In cursu honorum is a Latin phrase that translates to "in a course of honors."  It refers to specialized study at the undergraduate level.  Generally, a small percentage of a student body will be invited to pursue a more rigorous course of study, and be required to maintain a high average.  If completed, the phrase in cursu honorum will generally be noted on the college transcript and the diploma of that graduate.

References 

Latin words and phrases